Wellard railway station is a railway station in Wellard, a suburb of Perth, Western Australia. It is on the Mandurah railway line, which is part of the Transperth commuter rail network, and is located at the centre of a transit oriented development. It has two side platforms located in a cutting, accessed by a ground-level station concourse. Services run every 10 minutes during peak, and every 15 minutes between peak. The station has a bus interchange with four bus stands, and three regular bus routes.

The station was known as Leda station during planning. The station was designed by Woodhead International Architects and MPS Architects. Construction of the station by Doric Constructions and Brierty Contractors started in late 2005. The station was complete by January 2007, and was opened on 23 December 2007, along with the rest of the Mandurah line.

Description
Wellard railway station is in Wellard, Western Australia, a suburb of Perth. The adjacent stations are Kwinana railway station towards Perth, and Rockingham railway station towards Mandurah.

The station consists of two side platforms situated in a cutting below ground level. At ground level is a concourse which can be used to cross over the railway or access the station's platforms. There is one escalator, one lift, and one set of stairs to each platform. On the station concourse is a kiosk, a customer service office, fare gates, and toilets. The station is fully accessible. At the north-western entrance to the station is a bus interchange with four bus stands. At the south-eastern entrance to the station is a car park with 297 car bays, and 15 motorcycle bays.

History

The station was known as Leda station during planning, named after the nearby suburb of Leda. In March 1999, the Government of Western Australia released the South West Metropolitan Railway Master Plan. It laid out the route of and stations along the proposed railway between Perth and Mandurah. Leda station was one of the stations included in the plan. The station had a projected number of daily boardings of 1,030.

In August 2002, the government released a new master plan, after a change in the railway's route south from Perth, and through Rockingham. Leda station was removed from the list of stations proposed to be built initially, relegated to being a future prospect. At some point after that plan was released, it was decided to build Leda station along with the rest of the line initially.

For the construction of the railway to Mandurah, among other rail projects in Perth, New MetroRail was set up as a division of the Public Transport Authority. The design and construction of the Mandurah railway line was split up into eight "packages". Among the things that were part of Package A was the bulk earthworks for several stations on the line, including Wellard station. The $310 million contract for Package A was awarded to a joint venture between John Holland, MacMahon Contractors, and Multiplex Constructions Pty Ltd on 23 May 2004.

The actual construction of Wellard station, along with Cockburn Central station and Kwinana station, was part of Package B. The designer for Package B was Woodhead International Architects and MPS Architects. The design contract was awarded to them in April 2002, at a cost of $2.1 million. Expressions of interest for the construction of Package B opened in September 2003. The contract for the construction of Package B was awarded to the consortium of Doric Constructions and Brierty Contractors in March 2005, at a cost of $32 million. Construction on the station began in late 2005. By January 2007, the station was complete and handed over to the Public Transport Authority. Wellard station opened along with the rest of the Mandurah line on 23 December 2007.

Transit-oriented development
The station is at the heart of an award-winning transit-oriented development scheme known as The Village at Wellard. Its design that incorporates parks, walkability, and rail proximity has earned it awards from the Urban Development Institute of Western Australia, Planning Institute Australia, Landscape Industries Association, and HIA Land-Corp.

Services
Wellard railway station is served by the Mandurah railway line on the Transperth network. These services are operated by Transperth Train Operations, a division of the Public Transport Authority. The line goes between Mandurah railway station and Perth railway station, continuing north from there as the Joondalup railway line. Mandurah line trains stop at the station every 10 minutes during peak on weekdays, and every 15 minutes during the day outside peak every day of the year except Christmas Day. At night, trains are half-hourly, or hourly. All services stop at all stations, except for the once-per-day K pattern, which runs early in the morning each direction, terminating and commencing at Rockingham station. The station saw 363,790 boardings in the 2013–14 financial year, making it the least used station on the Mandurah line.

Wellard station has a bus interchange with four bus stands. Bus services are operated by Transdev WA under contract.

References

External links

Wellard Station information page from Transperth
Archived construction photo gallery from New MetroRail

Mandurah line
Railway stations in Perth, Western Australia
Railway stations in Australia opened in 2007
City of Kwinana
Bus stations in Perth, Western Australia